The Alabama Central Railroad Company was incorporated under the general laws of Alabama on June 22, 1871, by certificate of incorporation dated June 21, 1871.

The Alabama Central Railroad Company acquired  of single-track, standard gauge steam railroad line between Selma, Alabama and York, Alabama from the purchasers of The Selma and Meridian Rail Road Company at the foreclosure sale of the Selma and Meridian Railroad company's assets on May 1, 1871. This line had been constructed between the years 1852 and 1864 by The Alabama and Mississippi Rivers Rail Road Company, the Selma and Meridian Railroad's name until November 29, 1864.

The Alabama Central Railroad Company constructed  of single-track, standard gauge steam railroad line between York, Alabama and Lauderdale, Mississippi in 1878.

The Alabama Central Railroad Company conveyed its property rights and franchises to the East Tennessee, Virginia and Georgia Railroad Company by deed on June 15, 1881.

The property eventually became part of Southern Railway Company on July 7, 1894, through Southern Railway's acquisition of a later successor company of the East Tennessee, Virginia and Georgia Railroad Company, namely the East Tennessee, Virginia and Georgia Railway Company.

See also 

 East Tennessee, Virginia and Georgia Railroad Company

Notes

References 
 Interstate Commerce Commission. Southern Ry. Co., Volume 37, Interstate Commerce Commission Valuation Reports, November 6, 1931. Washington: United States Government Printing Office, 1932. .

Defunct Alabama railroads
Predecessors of the Southern Railway (U.S.)
Railway companies established in 1871
Railway companies disestablished in 1881